World music is an English phrase for styles of music from non-Western countries.

World Music may refer to:

"World music" (term), credited to ethnomusicologist Robert E. Brown
World Music (Goat album), 2012
World Music (Taj Mahal album), 1993

See also
World of Music (disambiguation)
Fête de la Musique, or World Music Day, on June 21 every year
Awards for world music
Putumayo World Music, an American record label